Below is a list of covered bridges in Connecticut. , there were nine authentic covered bridges in the U.S. state of Connecticut; three of these are historic.  A covered bridge is considered authentic not due to its age, but by its construction. An authentic bridge is constructed using trusses rather than other methods such as stringers, a popular choice for non-authentic covered bridges.

Bridges

See also

 List of bridges on the National Register of Historic Places in Connecticut
 World Guide to Covered Bridges

References

Further reading

External links

 National Society for the Preservation of Covered Bridges
 Visit Connecticut article about the state's covered bridges

Connecticut
 
covered bridges
Bridges, covered